William Alan Horstmeyer (July 4, 1930 – August 22, 1964) was an American racing driver from Madison, Wisconsin.

The 34 year old Horstmeyer was an experienced midget car and sprint car racer when he made his Championship Car debut at the Illinois State Fairgrounds Racetrack for the Tony Bettenhausen Memorial in August 1964. On lap 24 his car brushed the outside wall entering the front stretch and lost a wheel, which caused that corner to dig into the dirt, flipping the car several times. The car landed upside down and on fire with Horstmeyer trapped inside. Horstmeyer died of burn injuries later that day.

References

External links
Bill Horstmeyer at ChampCarStats.com

1930 births
1964 deaths
Racing drivers who died while racing
Racing drivers from Wisconsin
Sportspeople from Madison, Wisconsin
Sports deaths in Illinois